The Cinderella Man is a 1917 American silent comedy film directed by George Loane Tucker and starring Mae Marsh, Tom Moore and Alec B. Francis. The film's sets were designed by the art director Hugo Ballin.

Plot summary 
When Marjorie Caner returns from abroad, she is quite lonely in her millionaire father's big house. Learning that a young poet, Anthony Quintard, is living in poverty next door while working on the libretto of a great opera, she skips across the roofs and brings him a Christmas banquet. The poet sees Marjorie, and knowing that he detests wealth, she pretends to be the secretary of the Caner family. Marjorie volunteers to type his libretto, and a close intimacy grows between them. Tony wins a $10,000 prize for his work, but is enraged when he discovers that Marjorie is an heiress. Morris Caner, mellowed under his daughter's tutelage, comes to the rescue by feigning financial ruin, and manages to reconcile the two lovers.

Cast
 Mae Marsh as Marjorie Caner
 Tom Moore as Anthony Quintard
 Alec B. Francis as Romney Evans
 George Fawcett as Morris Caner
 Louis R. Grisel as Primrose
 George Farren as William Sewall
 Elizabeth Arians as Mrs. Prune
 Mrs. J. Cogan as Celeste
 Dean Raymond as Dr. Thayer
 Harry Scarborough as Blodgett

References

Bibliography
 Donald W. McCaffrey & Christopher P. Jacobs. Guide to the Silent Years of American Cinema. Greenwood Publishing, 1999.

External links
 

1917 films
1917 comedy films
1910s English-language films
American silent feature films
Silent American comedy films
American black-and-white films
Films directed by George Loane Tucker
Goldwyn Pictures films
1910s American films